Innocenzo Migliavacca, O. Cist. or Innocenzo Milliavacca (16 July 1635 – 21 February 1714) was a Roman Catholic prelate who served as Bishop of Asti (1693–1714).

Biography
Innocenzo Migliavacca was born in Milan, Italy on 16 July 1635.
He was ordained a deacon in the Cistercian Order on 16 July 1635 and then ordained a priest on 15 June 1658.
On 8 June 1693, he was appointed during the papacy of Pope Innocent XII as Bishop of Asti.
On 14 June 1693, he was consecrated bishop by Marcantonio Barbarigo, Bishop of Corneto e Montefiascone with  Ercole Domenico Monanni, Bishop of Terracina, Priverno e Sezze, and Giovanni Battista Visconti Aicardi, Bishop of Novara, serving as co-consecrators. 
He served as Bishop of Asti until his death on 21 February 1714.

References

External links and additional sources
 (for Chronology of Bishops) 
 (for Chronology of Bishops) 

17th-century Italian Roman Catholic bishops
18th-century Italian Roman Catholic bishops
Bishops appointed by Pope Innocent XII
1635 births
1714 deaths
Cistercian bishops